Pasokification is the decline of centre-left social-democratic political parties in European and other Western countries during the 2010s, often accompanied by the rise of nationalist, left-wing and right-wing populist alternatives. In Europe, the share of votes for such parties was at its 70-year lowest in 2015.

The term originates from the Greek party PASOK, which saw a declining share of the vote in national elections — from 43.92% in 2009 to 13.18% in May 2012, to 12.28% in June 2012 and 4.68% in 2015 — due to its poor handling of the Greek government-debt crisis and implementation of harsh austerity measures. Simultaneously, the left-wing anti-austerity Syriza party saw a growth in vote share and influence. Since PASOK's decline, the term has been applied to similar declines for other social-democratic and Third Way parties.

In 2020s, SPD winning the 2021 German federal election, Labour Party and PASOK-KINAL performing well in the polls for the upcoming United Kingdom and Greek elections repectively led to discussions about the possibility of "De-Pasokification", "reverse pasokification", "kinalification."

In Europe

Austria 
The Social Democratic Party of Austria lost 5.7 percentage points in the 2019 Austrian legislative election, resulting in a share of 21.2%, the party's worst election result since World War II.

Bulgaria
The Bulgarian Socialist Party lost 12.2 percentage points and fell from 80 to 43 seats in the April 2021 Bulgarian parliamentary election. In the July 2021 Bulgarian parliamentary election the party lost another 1.6 percentage points, returning to parliament with just 36 seats. In the November 2021 Bulgarian general election, the BSP lost a further 3.27 percentage points and returned to parliament with 26 seats, their worst result since democratic reforms; however, the party joined the new coalition government.

Croatia
The Social Democratic Party of Croatia had in the 2019 European Parliament election (18.7%) their worst EP election result, in the 2020 parliamentary election (24.9%) their worst parliamentary election result since 2003 and in the first round of the 2019–20 presidential election they had their worst result since 2000 but in the end they won the second round.

Czech Republic
The Czech Social Democratic Party lost much of its support in the 2017 Czech legislative election, falling from 50 in the previous general election to just 15 seats out of 200. They did even worse in 2021, with its vote share falling below the threshold required for representation in the legislature.

France
The Socialist Party's decline since its victory in the 2012 presidential election has been described as an example of Pasokification. By 2016, then-President François Hollande's approval rating was just 4%, and he became the first President in the history of the Fifth Republic not to run for re-election. In the 2017 presidential election, Socialist Party candidate Benoît Hamon suffered an historically poor result, placing fifth with 6.4% of the vote. In the 2017 legislative election a month later, the Socialist Party suffered the worst losses of any party, falling from 280 to 30 seats. The Socialist-led centre-left faction received 9.5% of the vote during the first round and only 45 seats overall. In the 2019 European elections, the PS allied with a number of minor centre-left parties, but still placed only sixth. It became the smallest party to win seats, receiving 6.2% of the vote. It was surpassed by both Europe Ecology – The Greens and the left-wing populist La France Insoumise. In the 2022 French presidential election, Socialist Party candidate, Anne Hidalgo, received only 1.7% of the vote.

Finland
The Social Democratic Party of Finland began to lose votes in 2007 (3.03%) and achieved their worst results to date in 2011 (19.10%) and 2015 (16.51%). Although they managed to become the strongest force in 2019 for the first time in a decade, they also had their second worst success in their history, with just under 18%. Additionally, on the municipal level, the SDP have been declining for decades. The SDP used to be the party with the most seats of representation in the council as well as the top vote share from the 1950s to 2000, however following the 2008 municipal elections, the National Coalition Party became the strongest in terms of the vote share and the Centre Party has had the most individual representatives, partly due to dominance in agrarian and rural based municipalities. Additionally, the general decline of SDP's vote share in municipal elections can perhaps be explained by the overall decline of the number of municipalities from roughly 600 in the 1940s to about 500 in 1970 and the mid 300s in the early 2000s.

The Åland Social Democrats halved their voting rates between 2011 and 2019.

Germany
The Social Democratic Party of Germany (SPD) has been cited as an example of Pasokification. Its popularity has waned since the late 2000s, particularly in the 2009 federal election, when it recorded its worst result since before the Second World War. The SPD's post-2005 decline has been attributed to its decision to enter into grand coalitions with its traditional rival, the conservative Christian Democratic Union. Despite a small recovery in 2013/14, the SPD's decline continued through the late 2010s, winning just 20.5% of the vote in the 2017 federal election. Similarly poor results have been recorded in local and state elections across the country. The SPD won just 15.8% of the vote in the 2019 European Parliament election in Germany, falling to third place in a national election for the first time in its history. This decline was somewhat halted however as the SPD won the most seats in the 2021 federal election with 25.7% of the vote (although this was the smallest vote share of a first-placed party in an election in the post-war period). The 2021 election also brought with it a much higher vote share for the Green party, and resulted in a left-liberal traffic-light coalition (SPD-GRÜNE-FDP) taking power.

Greece
PASOK was once the dominant centre-left party in Greece. PASOK received just 4.8% and 6.3% of the vote in the 2015 January and September Greek legislative elections respectively, due to its enforcement of harsh austerity measures in the wake of the European debt crisis, which, along with the ensuing Great Recession, led to massive social unrest and economic collapse, with much of its former electorate going to the anti-austerity Syriza. Following a series of austerity and bailout packages, implemented despite rejection in the 2015 Greek bailout referendum, resulting in several splits within the party, Syriza was defeated in the 2019 legislative election while the social democratic alliance Movement for Change (KINAL, which includes PASOK and minor centre-left movements) rebounded to 8.1% and gained 22 seats.

Hungary
The Hungarian Socialist Party lost significant support in the 2010 Hungarian parliamentary election after a series of corruption scandals affected Ferenc Gyurcsány's government. It suffered defeat again in the 2014 and 2018 parliamentary elections, falling from 29 to 16 seats in the latter.

Iceland
The Social Democratic Alliance (SDA) was formed in 1999 to unite the fragmented Icelandic left-wing. In its first decade it established itself as the second-strongest force behind the right-wing Independence Party, debuting at 26.8% in 1999 and improving to 31.0% in 2003. The SDA became the largest party in the country in the 2009 election with 29.8%. However, it suffered a major defeat in the 2013 election with 12.9%. They were reduced to just 5.7% in 2016, becoming the smallest of seven parties in parliament, and were surpassed by the Left-Green Movement as the strongest left-wing party in Iceland. This was the worst ever result for the SDA or its predecessor party the Social Democratic Party since they first ran for election in August 1916, when they won 6.8%. The SDA achieved a minor recovery in the 2017 election with 12.1%, though they remained a minor force behind the Left-Greens, whose leader Katrín Jakobsdóttir went on to become Prime Minister.

Ireland
The Labour Party received 6.6% of the vote in the 2016 Irish general election and fell from 33 to 7 seats, down from 19.5% in the 2011 general election. This fell further to 4.4% in the 2020 general election—their worst result since 1987—while the left wing nationalist Sinn Féin had its best result since 1922.

Italy
The Democratic Party (PD) started to lose support by the late 2000s in the Po Valley. The first election in which the Democratic Party lost to a more radical party was the 2010 Venetian regional election (20.34% of the vote, compared to the 35.16% obtained by Lega Nord). The party's 18.8% vote share in the 2018 Italian general election meant it lost 185 seats in the Chamber of Deputies and 58 seats in the Senate, falling from the largest to the third-largest faction in the Italian parliament. This was particularly dramatic considering that the party received more than 40% of vote just four year prior, in the 2014 European Parliament election in Italy, and is commonly attributed to its enforcement of austerity measures, a poor economic recovery and a failed attempt to move towards a two-party system in the 2016 Italian constitutional referendum. However, the party still came in second place in the popular vote and entered government in September 2019 with the Five Star Movement after the collapse of the previous Conte I Cabinet. After the collapse of the second Conte government in January 2021, the PD joined the new government of national unity leaded by Mario Draghi, former director of the European Central Bank. After the latter's crisis in summer 2022 and the general elections in October (which saw a landslide victory for right-wing parties), the Democratic Party returned to opposition.

Lithuania 
The Social Democratic Party of Lithuania received 9.59% of the vote in the 2020 Lithuanian parliamentary election, down from 15.04% in 2016 and 18.37% in 2012.

Luxembourg 
The Luxembourg Socialist Workers' Party (LSAP) received 20.2% of the vote in the 2013 Luxembourg general election, their lowest support since the 1931 general election. This decreased further to 17.60% in the 2018 general election, ranking third for number of seats for the first time since 1999. However, the LSAP has been part of Luxembourg's coalition governments since the 2013 election.

Netherlands 
The social-democratic Labour Party received 5.7% of the vote in the 2017 Dutch general election, down from 24.8% in the 2012 general election.

Norway
Before the 1997 parliamentary elections, Labour Party leader Thorbjørn Jagland infamously promised that if, should his party get less than 36,9% of the votes, his government would step down. The final results gave the Labour Party merely 35,0%, and paved the way for a centrist minority government. This coalition government fell in March 2000 after a vote of no confidence, whereafter the Labour Party again formed a government supported by the Centre Party and the Socialist Left Party. This government only lasted until the 2001 elections however, when they lost it to the same centrist coalition. In this election the Labour Party got only 24.3% of the votes, their worst electoral result since 1924. 

Support for the party soon rebounded slightly, but has been steadily declining since the 2013 election. Despite their victory in the 2021 Norwegian parliamentary election, where they scored 26,3% of the votes, the party lost a seat and were briefly in third-place behind the Conservative Party and the Centre Party in pre-election polls. After forming a minority government with the Centre Party in October 2021, support for the Labour Party has dropped drastically in the polls, scoring as low as 15,5% in March 2023. Parallel to this drop in support, the Norwegian radical left, represented by the Red Party and Socialist Left Party has seen increased support in the polls. The Red Party also managed to break the electoral threshold of 4% for the first time since its formation in the 2021 elections, gaining 8 mandates in the Storting.

Poland
The Democratic Left Alliance became only third during the rise of the liberal Civic Platform in the end of 2003. In 2015 they only got 7.55% and lost all seats but returned into the Sejm in 2019.

Spain 
The 2015 Spanish general election produced the worst results for the social-democratic Spanish Socialist Workers' Party (PSOE) since the Spanish transition to democracy in the 1970s, as the party received 22% of the vote, losing support to Unidas Podemos. The PSOE returned to government following the 2018 vote of no confidence in the government of Mariano Rajoy and, in the April 2019 general election, became the largest party since 2008 and obtained its best result since 2011 with 28.7% of the vote.

Sweden
The Swedish Social Democratic Party averaged 45.3% of the votes in half of all general elections between the mid-1930s and mid-1980s, making it one of the most successful political parties in the history of the liberal democratic world. In the 1968 election, the Social Democrats even won an outright majority with 50,12% of the votes. In the late 1990s, the party began to receive just under 40% of the votes. After the 2010 Swedish general election, their vote share dramatically declined, some of these votes being lost to the right-wing populist party Sweden Democrats. In the 2018 general election, the Social Democrats' only received 28.3% of the votes, its lowest level since 1908.

United Kingdom 

Scottish Labour held the majority of Scotland's Westminster seats from the 1964 United Kingdom general election until the 2015 United Kingdom general election in Scotland, where the Scottish National Party (SNP) won 56 of the 59 available seats. The SNP then fell to 35 seats at the 2017 general election in Scotland and rose to 48 in the 2019 general election in Scotland. Scottish Labour had lost support since the creation of the Scottish Parliament. The party got 33.6% of the votes in the 1999 Scottish Parliament election and 19.1% of the votes in the 2016 Scottish Parliament election. This allowed the SNP to overtake Scottish Labour by 2015.

Pasokification has not taken place in Wales, where Welsh Labour have consistently held the Welsh devolved government derived from the Senedd (Welsh Assembly/Parliament) from when it was first established in 1999. It is practically impossible for any one party to win an outright majority in the Welsh electoral system - a combination of SMDP and an adjusted regional list vote known as AMS. However, Welsh Labour have won a working-majority (30/60 seats) a number of times, including in the May 2021 Senedd elections where their English and Scottish equivalents underperformed in local and national elections. Though Welsh Labour has successfully retained control of the devolved administration, the share of Labour seats from Wales in the Westminster House of Commons has slightly declined since 1945.

In 2015 the national Labour Party elected Jeremy Corbyn as their leader. Corbyn's leadership has been characterized as more left-wing than that of his predecessors of the New Labour era. In 2017, Labour stalled their long decline by increasing their vote share for the first time since 2001. However, the 2019 general election resulted in a catastrophic defeat in which the governing Conservative Party — led by Boris Johnson — won many long-held Labour seats in the party's traditional Northern English heartlands (described as the "red wall"). Brexit and the unpopularity of Jeremy Corbyn were listed as reasons for the defeat. Corbyn was succeeded as party leader in April 2020 by Keir Starmer. In May 2021, Starmer failed to improve on the party's fortunes in a 'bumper' set of local and devolved parliamentary elections taking place due to Mayoral and local races being postponed due to COVID-19 in 2020. Among the failures was another catastrophic loss in the 'Red Wall' Hartlepool by-election for the Westminster parliament to the Conservative candidate by nearly 7,000 votes. Hartlepool had previously been held by Labour under Corbyn twice in 2017 and 2019. The Conservative victory has largely been attributed to large numbers of former Brexit Party and UKIP supporters switching to the Conservatives - rather than the 'successor' to the Brexit Party, the 'Reform' party - as well as many Labour supporters supporting third-party or independent candidates.

The Social Democratic and Labour Party in Northern Ireland consistently lost votes between 1998 and 2017. The Manx Labour Party has been in decline since 2001, and even lost their representation in the House of Keys in 2016.

Outside of Europe

Israel 
The Israeli Labor Party and its predecessor Mapai were dominant in Israeli politics from the founding of the nation in 1948 to 1977. Since then, its popularity has been gradually decreasing, especially since the start of the 21st century. In the 2020 election the party only gained 3 seats as part of Labor-Gesher-Meretz coalition, being in acute danger of altogether disappearing, but slightly rebounded and got 7 seats in the 2021 election, which allowed it to join the multi-party government.

In 2022, the party barely passed the electoral threshold and gained 4 seats.

Sri Lanka 
The social-democratic Sri Lanka Freedom Party lost the 2015 Sri Lankan presidential election to party defector Maithripala Sirisena, who campaigned on a broad alliance lead by the United National Party against the decade-long rule of the Freedom Party's leader Mahinda Rajapaksa, who faced allegations of corruption and nepotism. The following 2015 Sri Lankan parliamentary election saw the formation of a national government, which soon faced major infighting. Rajapaksa went on to form a new party, Sri Lanka Podujana Peramuna (SLPP), and successfully contested several local government elections. gaining 40.47% of the votes; the Sri Lanka Freedom Party only gained 12.10%, while the United National Party gained 29.42%.

The SLPP nominated Rajapaksa's younger brother Gotabaya Rajapaksa for the 2019 Sri Lankan presidential election, who gained 52.25% against the United National Party candidate Sajith Premadasa (who gained 41.99%). Gotabaya Rajapaksa contested on a pro-nationalistic, economic development and national security platform. Sri Lanka Freedom Party had hoped to have its own candidate for the presidential election, but eventually opted to support the SLPP.

Latin America 
Following the pink tide, where left wing and center-left wing parties In Latin America were successful, a conservative wave happened from mid-2010s to the early 2020s as a direct reaction to the pink tide. Although the extent to which the Latin American leftist parties which have also suffered setbacks are located in the social democratic tradition is contested.

See Also 

 Conservative wave

References 

PASOK
Politics of Greece
Politics of the European Union
Social democracy